Lucas Reiber (born October 4, 1993) is a German actor. He is best known for his roles in the films Suck Me Shakespeer 2, The Red Band Society and Die Mutter des Mörders, and for portraying Niklas in the television series Binny and the Ghost.

Biography
He was born and raised in Lichterfelde before moving to Kreuzberg when he was 14.
His mother is Claudia Reiber and he has a sister, Lisa Reiber. His father became a vegan.

Reiber first appeared on stage in 2003 at the age of ten; he impersonated the young Gavroche in the musical Les Misérables at the Theater des Westens. From 2008, he was a member of the "junge Ensemble" (jE) of the Friedrichstadt-Palast, where he studied singing, acting and dance from 2008 to 2011. He took part in several productions there. From 2011 onwards, further acting coachings and singing lessons followed.

In 2009, under the direction of Peter Keglevic, he played his first film role in the two-part television film Ken Follett's  (based on Whiteout). He impersonated the teenager Craig alongside Heiner Lauterbach (as Craig's grandfather 'Stanley Oxenford') and Sophie von Kessel (as Craig's mother 'Olga'). In his first feature film, the youth film Rock It! (2010), he played the role of Marc, the keyboarder of the rock band, alongside Maria Ehrich and Emilia Schüle. Before the film, he had keyboard lessons for six years and then got guitar lessons for the film. In 2011, he starred alongside Christian Ulmen in the feature film Einer wie Bruno; he played the young musician Benny Schmidtbauer.

In the film comedy Fack ju Göhte 2 (2015), Reiber played the role of Etienne ("Ploppi"). a boy with Asperger's Syndrome. In the opinion of Christoph Schröder, Reiber formed "the only ray of hope" in Fack ju Göhte 2 in the weekly newspaper Die Zeit. In 2016, he received together with Anna Lena Klenke, Max von der Groeben and Jella Haase, the Bavarian Film Award.

Reiber then participated in several television films in major and minor roles. In the ZDF channel three-part , he had in the 3rd part of the small role of bellboy Raphael. In the ZDF television comedy Zwei mitten im Leben, he played Henry, the friend of the drug-consuming 17-year-old son of the mayor Bea Westkamp (Johanna Gastdorf).

In the ARD TV movie Sprung ins Leben, he appeared in March 2014, alongside Simone Thomalla, in his first major role on television. He played the talented football player Sebastian, who uses a wheelchair after a car accident. He excelled in his role a "sensitive portrait of a traumatized young people". In the TV two-parter Die Himmelsleiter in 2015, he played Bruno Zettler, the son of Cologne based black market dealer and former NS - Ortsgruppenleiter Armin Zettler. In the ZDF thriller Die Mutter des Mörders (The mother of the murderer), he had the lead role, on the side of Natalia Wörner. He played Matis, the 20-year-old, mentally handicapped son of the supermarket saleswoman Maria, who comes under suspicion of murder after a violent crime. For his acting performance, he was awarded the 2016 New Faces Award.

Reiber also took over roles in television series. In the third season of the RTL series Doctor's Diary, he played in the scenes with the childhood memories the role of the young Marc Meier, played by Florian David Fitz. In the multi-award-winning Disney series Binny and the Ghost, he was in both seasons as Niklas Neudecker in front of the camera. Two episodes in which he starred as episodes were awarded the 'Goldener Spatz' in 2015. He had further episodes of main roles in the television series Heldt (2013, as paraplegic accident victim Manuel Unterberg) and in Leipzig Homicide (2013, the best friend of a young man who died of an overdose of crystal meth). In January 2017, Reiber was in the ZDF crime series SOKO 5113 (or SOKO Munich) in an episode main role to see; he played Matti Fauser, the ex-boyfriend of a dead youngster tennis player.

In addition to his film career, Reiber occasionally performs in the theater. In March / April 2013, he appeared in the theater on the Kurfürstendamm in Berlin in the role of teenage and half-orphan Jay in the tragicomedy A normal family by Neil Simon. His stage partners were Peggy Lukac (as grandmother) and Chiara Schoras (as Aunt Bella).

Reiber is a member of the Deutsche Filmakademie (German Film Academy).

Awards
 2016: Bavarian Film Award for Best Young Actor for film Fack Ju Göhte 2
 2016: Bunte's 'New Faces Award' for Best Newcomer for TV Movie The Mother of the Murderer (or Die Mutter des Mörders)

Filmography

Film

Television

Personal life
He likes jogging, cycling and playing a lot of volleyball. In 2015, he was living in a shared flat, in Moabit. He believes in sustainability and wears fair trade clothes. In 2018, he was driving an Opel Insignia GS car.

References

External links

1993 births
Living people
People from Steglitz-Zehlendorf
German male film actors
German male voice actors
21st-century German male actors
Male actors from Berlin